Rock Creek-Lima Township is one of twelve townships in Carroll County, Illinois, USA.  As of the 2020 census, its population was 1,993 and it contained 921 housing units.

Geography

Cities, towns, villages
 Lanark
 Brookville

Cemeteries
The township contains these three cemeteries: Brookville Lutheran, Lanark City and Schriner.

Major highways
  US Route 52
  Illinois Route 64
  Illinois Route 73

Demographics
As of the 2020 census there were 1,993 people, 777 households, and 560 families residing in the township. The racial makeup of the township was 94.23% White, 0.55% African American, 0.10% Native American, 0.40% Asian, 0.00% Pacific Islander, 1.05% from other races, and 3.66% from two or more races. Hispanic or Latino of any race were 2.26% of the population.

There were 777 households, out of which 27.90% had children under the age of 18 living with them, 57.14% were married couples living together, 11.58% had a female householder with no spouse present, and 27.93% were non-families. 22.50% of all households were made up of individuals, and 16.00% had someone living alone who was 65 years of age or older. The average household size was 2.34 and the average family size was 2.75.

The township's age distribution consisted of 20.9% under the age of 18, 9.0% from 18 to 24, 19.8% from 25 to 44, 26.7% from 45 to 64, and 23.6% who were 65 years of age or older. The median age was 46.1 years. For every 100 females, there were 99.5 males. For every 100 females age 18 and over, there were 99.9 males.

The median income for a household in the township was $60,439, and the median income for a family was $80,400. Males had a median income of $43,889 versus $24,479 for females. The per capita income for the township was $32,856. About 8.8% of families and 12.3% of the population were below the poverty line, including 19.2% of those under age 18 and 5.1% of those age 65 or over.

School districts
 Chadwick-Milledgeville Community Unit School District 399
 Eastland Community Unit School District 308

Political districts
 Illinois's 17th congressional district
 State House District 89
 State Senate District 45

References
 
 United States Census Bureau 2007 TIGER/Line Shapefiles
 United States National Atlas

External links
 City-Data.com
 Illinois State Archives
 Carroll County official site

Townships in Carroll County, Illinois
Townships in Illinois